HMS Sirius was an  of the British Royal Navy which served from 1892 to 1918 in various colonial posts such as the South and West African coastlines and off the British Isles as a hastily converted minelayer during the First World War.

Design and construction

She was one of 10 ships of the class that was sheathed in wood and copper to reduce fouling. Two QF  guns were mounted fore and aft on the ship's centreline, while six 4.7 in (120 mm) guns were mounted three on each broadside. 8 six pounder guns and 1 three pounder provided protection against torpedo boats.

Sirius was laid down in September 1889, launched on 27 October 1890 and entered service in September 1891.

Service
Sirius served off America from 1892 to 1895 and on the China station from 1903 to 1905. On return from overseas, she went into reserve at Devonport. In February 1912, Sirius became part of the training squadron.

In October 1914 Sirius was one of a number of obsolete warships deployed to support Belgian troops during the Battle of the Yser, carrying out shore bombardments from 23 October. Sirius served as part of the Nore Command from 1914 to March 1915, being used as a guardship on the East coast of the United Kingdom, and was then sent to serve off West Africa, where she remained on station until 1918.

In April 1918, Sirius was deliberately scuttled in the mouth of Ostend harbour in Belgium during the failed First Ostend Raid. This operation was intended to block the harbour mouth and prevent the transit of German U-boats and other raiding craft from Bruges to the North Sea. German countermeasures were however too effective, and Sirius and her fellow blockship  were eventually destroyed by their crews outside the harbour mouth after running aground on a sandbank. The wrecks were broken up after the war.

Notes
Citations

References

External links

 

Apollo-class cruisers
Ships built by Armstrong Whitworth
Ships built on the River Tyne
1890 ships
World War I cruisers of the United Kingdom
Maritime incidents in 1918
World War I shipwrecks in the English Channel